Madrid, the capital city of Spain, is divided into 21 districts (distritos), which are further subdivided into 131 neighborhoods (barrios).

List